Street children in the Philippines was first seen in the 1980s, and is estimated to be 250,000.

Defining Filipino street children
According to the "Stairway" foundation, there are three different categories of street children:
Children on the streets make up approximately 75% of the street children in the Philippines. They work on the streets but do not live there. They generally have a home to return to after working, and some even continue to attend school while working long hours on the streets.
Children of the street make their homes on the street. They make up 25%-30% of the street children in the Philippines. They often create a sort of family with their fellow street children. Some of them still have family ties, but may either rarely tend to them or view them negatively.
Completely abandoned children have no family ties and are entirely on their own for physical and psychological survival. They make up approximately 5%-10% of the street children in the Philippines.

Human rights 
The Philippines ratified the United Nations Convention on the Rights of the Child on August 21, 1990. It also ratified the Optional Protocol to the Convention on the Rights of the Child on the involvement of children in armed conflict on August 26, 2003, and the Optional Protocol to the Convention on the Rights of the Child on the sale of children, child prostitution, and child pornography on May 28, 2002.

Problems facing street children

Poverty
Children bear the brunt of poverty of affected Filipino families. Poverty, displacement due to armed conflict, and exposure to climatic and environmental impacts are key factors that lead to heightened vulnerability and increases in the number of street children. In 2015, 31.4% of children in the Philippines lived below the poverty line, with poverty rates for children in the Autonomous Region in Muslim Mindanao much higher at 63.1%, according to official government estimates.

Street children are more likely to live in poverty, be deprived of access to education and other social services, and experience social discrimination. They are also less likely to have of access to justice or legal status.

Drugs
The most common substances are inhalants, such as solvents, rugby (a toluene-based glue) and cough syrups, followed by marijuana and shabu. Marijuana and shabu in particular are shared with friends whenever one of the group has enough money to buy them. Some street children take drugs as often as once a day. A 1997 study estimated that up to 40% of street children had used drugs in the past. Other reports suggest that 66% to 85% of children had used inhalants, and 3% had used marijuana and shabu.

Summary execution of street children
Many street children were in danger of summary execution during the Marcos Government era. In 2005, a report found that 39 children in Davao City had been killed by vigilante groups since 2001, most after having been released from police detention cells.

Child prostitution
Child prostitutes are used by foreign sex tourists and sexual predators, as well as local people. Some are used to film child pornography, which is rampant in the Philippines. Many street children are lured into prostitution as a means of survival, while others do it to earn money for their families. A variety of different factors contribute to the commercial sexual exploitation of children in the Philippines.

Rooted in poverty, as elsewhere, the problem of child prostitution in Angeles City was exacerbated in the 1980s by Clark Air Base, where bars employed children who ended up as sex workers for American soldiers. Street children are at particular risk because many of the 200 brothels in Angeles offer children for sex. According to 1996 statistics of the Philippine Resource Network, 60,000 of the 1.5 million street children in the Philippines were prostituted.

HIV/AIDS and STDs
There is no HIV testing for children in the Philippines, but approximately 18% of the street children contract sexually transmitted infections (STIs).

NGO responses

Various organizations have established charities and shelters, providing counseling, food, clothing and religious instruction in an attempt to help street children. These include Street Contact For Children, Subic Bay Children's Home, LifeChild, Spirit and Life Mission House, Tiwala Kids and Communities , Batang Pinangga Foundation, Inc (Cebu) Jireh Children's Home, He Cares Foundation, ANAK-Tnk Foundation, and the Tuloy Foundation, among others.

Preventive measures 
Promoting access to early education. The Department of Social Welfare and Development (DSWD) used to provide for public day-care centers. It has since become the responsibility of local government units (LGUs) by virtue of the 1991 Local Government Code. Since then, the DSWD has focused on accreditation standards setting, compliance monitoring, provision of technical assistance, and capability building. There are also day-care centers that are operated by NGOs, faith-based organizations, parents’ groups, and private individuals. Day-care centers are designed to provide supplemental parental care to children of working mothers for part of the day. It can accommodate 30 children at a time; with morning and afternoon sessions, a center's capacity doubles to 60. Some factories and government agencies and corporations also provide worksite-based child-care centers for their employees.

Organizing LCPC. Another strategy is the organization of local councils for the protection of children (LCPC) at all levels of local government, especially at the barangay level. The barangay is the primary implementing structure closest to children. This unit, however, must implement many other duties in compliance to a multitude of directives coming from the local chief executive and national level agencies. There is an urgent need to support barangays to directly respond to the needs of children. While organizing rates are high, their functionality remains in question. In most cases, the activities of the BCPCs depend on the priorities of the local chief (barangay captain), who also sits as chair of the BCPC. The programs take off or falter depending on his/her interest. Wherever children's concerns are not the main priority, the BCPCs are not convened, or if convened at all, are nonfunctional. In many cases, civil society groups undertake initiatives without much barangay support. The same is true at the municipal, city, or provincial levels.

Upgrading competencies of childcare providers. UNICEF has also helped the Philippine Government in the capacity-building of childcare providers.

It has assisted in the following:
 Scaling up gender-sensitive capacity building for day-care workers and teachers to guarantee effective and gender-fair teaching-learning practices in day-care centers and schools.
 Designing recovery, rehabilitation, and reintegration services for abused children to address the special needs of girls.
 Building the capacity of health sector workers, male and females, to provide women access to prenatal care and health facilities with more skilled birth attendants.
 Promoting youth participation, which addresses the specific barriers that children face from participating actively at home, in school, in the community and in the larger society.

Notable street children 
 Darwin Ramos

See also
Children in jail in the Philippines
Rugby boy, street gangs

General:
 Poverty in the Philippines

References

Philippines
Poverty in the Philippines
Street children
Filipino children
Childhood in the Philippines